Diabolical Women is an American crime documentary television series which focuses on females who have committed crimes. It is produced by LMNO Entertainment Group.

Broadcast
The three part series premiered in the U.S. on Lifetime Movie Network (LMN) on March 18, 2015 and concluded on April 1 in the same year.

Internationally, it premiered in Australia on the CI Network on August 18, 2015.

Episodes

References

External links
 
 

2015 American television series debuts
English-language television shows
Lifetime (TV network) original programming
2010s American crime television series